Ewa M. Thompson (born Ewa Majewska; 1937 in Kaunas) is a Polish-American Slavist at Rice University.  One of the areas of her research concerns imperial motives in Russian literature. She was the editor of the Sarmatian Review.

Post-colonialism 
Thompson's book Imperial Knowledge: Russian Literature and Colonialism was published in Polish in 2000. In it, she strongly asserted the need for revising textual practices around Russian literature that had legitimized colonial practices more brutal than what she called "canonical" colonial practices legitimated in British and French literature. She linked the silence about Russian hegemony about Central European colonies and colonial practices with a Western fascination with Russia, and subsequently with the Soviet Union. Although the book did not initially receive much recognition, it has been rediscovered and reinvigorated following the publication of Slavist Clare Cavanagh's works.

English language books
 Russian Formalism and Anglo-American New Criticism: A Comparative Study, The Hague: Mouton, 1971.
 Witold Gombrowicz, Boston: Twayne 1979.
 Understanding Russia: the Holy Fool in Russian Culture, University Press of America 1987.
 The Search for Self-Definition in Russian Literature, Houston: Rice University Press 1991.
  Imperial Knowledge: Russian Literature and Colonialism, Westport, CT and London: Greenwood 2000.

References

External links
Ewa M. Thompson’s Homepage 

Slavists
Rice University faculty
Living people
1937 births
Writers from Kaunas
Polish emigrants to the United States
20th-century American women writers
20th-century American non-fiction writers
American women academics
21st-century American women